The 2015–16 Macedonian Second Football League was the 24th season of the Macedonian Second Football League, the second  football division of Macedonia. It began on 15 August 2015 and ended on 14 May 2016.

Participating teams

League table

Results

Matches 1–18

Matches 19–27

Promotion play-off

First leg

Second leg

Pelister won 3–1 on aggregate.

Relegation play-off

The Relegation Playoff includes 6 clubs (the 8th placed theam from the Second League, as well as the 5 winners of the Third Leagues) which are going to be arranged in 3 pairs, playing on home-away rule. The winners of those playoffs win a spot for the next seasons Second League.

First leg

Second leg

3–3 on aggregate. Ljubanci won 5–3 in penalty shootout.

Akademija Pandev won 5–2 on aggregate.

Vardar Negotino won 5–0 on aggregate.

Season statistics

Top scorers

Source: MacedonianFootball.com

See also
2015–16 Macedonian Football Cup
2015–16 Macedonian First Football League
2015–16 Macedonian Third Football League

References

External links
Football Federation of Macedonia 
MacedonianFootball.com 

Macedonia 2
2
Macedonian Second Football League seasons